The Trinity Episcopal Cathedral is a cathedral church in Sacramento, California, United States. It is the seat of the Episcopal Diocese of Northern California.

History
The first Episcopal services were held in Sacramento in 1847 by the Rev. F. S. Mines of Trinity Church, San Francisco. Grace Church was founded the following day. Trinity had its beginnings as St. Andrew's Mission in 1897 with the Rev. Alfred George as Missionary.  From 1900 to 1903 it was reorganized as Trinity Church and a new church building was constructed. In 1910 Trinity was named the pro-cathedral by the Rt. Rev. William Hall Moreland. The Very Rev. John R. Atwill was named the first dean. Some of the parishioners objected and petitioned that Trinity be maintained as a parish, but to no avail. Because of financial difficulties Trinity and St. Paul's Church were merged to become Christ Church Cathedral in 1934. Trinity became the Bishop's Chapel at this time and from 1941 to 1945 Cathedral House became a home for servicemen during World War II. Following the war Trinity became a parish again in 1946 and a pro-cathedral in 1948. Ground was broken for the present church building in September 1954. The cornerstone was laid on May 30, 1955.  The cathedral was dedicated on October 23 of the same year. From 1988-1991 the Trinity 2000 Building Program was undertaken and the Great Hall was built.

See also
List of the Episcopal cathedrals of the United States
List of cathedrals in the United States

References

External links
Official Site

Religious organizations established in 1897
Churches completed in 1955
20th-century Episcopal church buildings
Episcopal church buildings in California
Episcopal cathedrals in California
T
1897 establishments in California